Northwest Florida State College is a public college in Niceville, Florida. It is part of the Florida College System and is accredited by the Southern Association of Colleges and Schools to award associate and baccalaureate degrees. Northwest Florida State College has multiple campuses but has operated continuously on its Niceville campus since 1963. The college also operates a charter high school, the Collegiate High School at Northwest Florida State College, which opened in 2000.

History

Early history 
Northwest Florida State College was founded in 1963 as Okaloosa-Walton Junior College, with its campus in Valparaiso, Florida; students started class the next year. A permanent campus in Niceville was dedicated in April 1969.

The school voted to change its name to Okaloosa-Walton Community College in 1988, and gained four-year status in 2003, thus changing its name to Okaloosa-Walton College. In June 2008, Governor Charlie Crist signed a bill that allowed several community colleges, including OWC, to offer four-year degrees and be considered part of Florida's upper education under the newly formed Florida College Pilot Project, making OWC one of the state colleges in Florida. Due to the change, school officials elected to once again change the name, this time to Northwest Florida State College.

2009 campus shooting 
On April 11, 2009, a lone gunman shot a vending machine maintenance worker at the center in DeFuniak Springs. The victim was shot twice in the chest and died from his injuries. The suspect, Thomas McCoy, a former co-worker of the victim, was apprehended and charged and found guilty of first degree murder.

2012 data breach 
Between May 21, 2012, and September 24, 2012, a large-scale security breach occurred at the college. The personal information of nearly 300,000 people, including 200,000 who had no connection to the institution, was stolen. Leaked information included names, Social Security numbers, birthdates, gender, and ethnicity as well as payroll and direct deposit information. No one was ever charged in the attack.

Campus locations 
As of the 2020-2021 year, Northwest Florida State College operates at six locations.
Niceville Campus (Okaloosa County)
 Fort Walton Beach Campus (Okaloosa County)
 Chautauqua Center (DeFuniak Springs, Walton County)
 Robert LF Sikes Center (Crestview, Okaloosa County)
 Hurlburt Field Center (Okaloosa County)
 South Walton Center (Walton County)

Collegiate High School at Northwest Florida State College 
The Collegiate High School at Northwest Florida State College (CHS) is a charter school in Niceville, Florida, established in 2000. From then until the fall semester of 2022, CHS enabled 10th-, 11th-, and 12th-grade students to simultaneously earn both a standard high school diploma and a transferable two-year college degree (Associate of Arts) or transferable college credits. The 2022-2023 school year introduced a freshman program that allows students to receive an Associate of Science degree. Only students who enroll as a freshman have access to the AS program, and, upon entering 10th-grade, they have the choice to continue in that program or transfer to the standard AA program. CHS is a public school and is free of charge to students. College-credit classes, college and high school textbooks, provision for transportation, use of a personal laptop computer, tutoring, and more are all provided at no cost. Students are allowed to participate in a wide range of college activities and extracurriculars including sports, the Raider Rhythms dance team, and the college's Student Government Association. CHS was named the #1 school in Florida for the 2002–2003, 2009–2010, and 2010–2011 school years and a U.S. Department of Education National Blue Ribbon School in both 2006 (receiving the award as "Okaloosa-Walton Collegiate High School") and 2013.

Mattie Kelly Arts Center 
The Mattie Kelly Arts Center is a performing arts and educational complex, with a 1,650-seat main stage theater, a 195-seat Sprint Theater, the Mattie Kelly Art Galleries, a music wing, a visual arts building and the NWFSC amphitheater. The Mattie Kelly Art Galleries consist of the McIlroy Gallery, and Holzhauer Gallery.

Athletics 
The school's athletic teams compete in the Panhandle Conference of the Florida State College Activities Association, a body of the National Junior College Athletic Association Region 8.

Notable alumni

References

External links 
 

Educational institutions established in 1963
Florida College System
Universities and colleges accredited by the Southern Association of Colleges and Schools
High schools in Okaloosa County, Florida
Charter schools in Florida
Education in Okaloosa County, Florida
Public high schools in Florida
1963 establishments in Florida
|}